Debut Records was an American jazz record company and label founded in 1952 by bassist Charles Mingus, his wife Celia, and drummer Max Roach.

This short-lived label was an attempt to avoid the compromises of working for major companies. Intended to showcase performances by new musicians, only about two dozen albums were issued before the company closed in 1957. Nonetheless, several prominent jazz musicians made their first recordings as leaders for Debut, including pianist Paul Bley, and trumpeters Kenny Dorham and Thad Jones. Saxophonist Hank Mobley made his recording debut on the label, as a sideman with Roach. Teo Macero, later a producer with Miles Davis, recorded his first album as a leader as a saxophonist for Debut, an album described by critic Dan Morgenstern as an oddball fusion of Lennie Tristano and Anton Webern.

Debut was the label on which the Jazz at Massey Hall concert album was first issued. Recorded in Toronto, it features Dizzy Gillespie, Charlie Parker, Bud Powell, Charles Mingus, and Max Roach, and was the last recorded meeting of long-term musical partners Parker and Gillespie.

In 1957, Danish bookseller Ole Vestegaard leased the company's catalogue from Mingus and produced recordings on the Danish Debut label by American jazz musicians who settled in Copenhagen or played at Jazzhus Montmartre.

After Celia and Charles Mingus divorced, Celia married Saul Zaentz in 1960. Charles gave the Zaentzes control of the rights to Debut catalog as a wedding gift. Mingus thought the gift fitting as Celia had handled the bulk of Debut's business affairs, and most of the seed money came from Celia's mother. Zaentz was later head of Fantasy Records, where the Debut recordings were subsequently reissued from 1962–1964.

A 12-CD set of the Debut recordings featuring Mingus, the majority of the label's output, was issued by Fantasy Records in 1990. A four-CD sequence entitled Mingus Rarities (Original Jazz Classics) collected some of the more obscure material featuring Mingus.

Discography
Debut Ten Inch series (10 inch LP)

DLP 1   Charles Mingus/Spaulding Givens - Strings and Keys
DLP 2   The Quintet - Jazz at Massey Hall, Vol. 1
DLP 3   Bud Powell Trio - Jazz At Massey Hall, Vol. 2
DLP 4   The Quintet - Jazz at Massey Hall, Vol. 3
DLP 5   Trombone Rapport - Jazz Workshop, Vol. 1
DLP 6   Teo Macero - Explorations
DLP 7   Paul Bley - Introducing Paul Bley
DLP 8   Oscar Pettiford - The New Oscar Pettiford Sextet
DLP 9   Kenny Dorham - Kenny Dorham Quintet
DLP 10  John LaPorta - The John LaPorta Quintet
DLP 11  Sam Most - Sam Most Quartet Plus Two
DLP 12  Thad Jones - The Fabulous Thad Jones
DLP 13  Max Roach - The Max Roach Quartet featuring Hank Mobley
DLP 14   Trombone Rapport - Jazz Workshop, Vol. 2
DLP 15   Ada Moore - Jazz Workshop, Vol. 3
DLP 16   Hazel Scott - Relaxed Piano Moods
DLP 17   Thad Jones/Charles Mingus - Jazz Collaborations, Vol. 1

Debut Twelve Inch series (12 inch LP):

DEB 120   Miles Davis - Blue Moods
DEB 121   John Dennis - New Piano Expressions
DEB 122   John LaPorta - Three Moods
DEB 123   Charles Mingus - Mingus at the Bohemia
DEB 124   The Quintet - Jazz at Massey Hall
DEB 125   Alonzo Levister - Manhattan Monodrama
DEB 126   Jazz Workshop - Trombone Rapport / Trombone Workshop (reissue of DLP 5 & DLP 14)
DEB 127   Thad Jones - Thad Jones
DEB 128   Charles Mingus - Chazz! (not released)
DEB 129   Jimmy Knepper - New Faces (some of the material appeared on Debut DL 101 - Danish EP)
DEB 198   Jazz Workshop - Autobiography in Jazz

Danish Debut Twelve Inch series (12 inch LP):
DEB 130   The Four Trombones – Trombone Rapport
DEB 131   Coleman Hawkins/Bud Powell/Oscar Pettiford/Kenny Clarke - The Essen Jazz Festival All Stars 
DEB 132   Oscar Pettiford and His Jazz Groups - My Little Cello 
DEB 133   The Axen/Jaedig Jazz Groups (Bent Axen/Bent Jædig) - Let's Keep the Message 
DEB 134   Jorn Elniff - Music for Mice and Men 
DEB 135   Louis Hjulmand & Allan Botschinsky Featuring Oscar Pettiford - Blue Brothers/Blue Bros.
DEB 136   Eric Dolphy - Eric Dolphy in Europe 
DEB 137   Brew Moore - Brew Moore in Europe 
DEB 138   Cecil Taylor - Live at the Cafe Montmartre 
DEB 139   Charles Mingus - Chazz! 
DEB 140   Albert Ayler - My Name Is Albert Ayler 
DEB 141   Sahib Shihab - Sahib's Jazz Party 
DEB 142   Don Byas - Don Byas' 30th Anniversary Album 
DEB 143   The Contemporary Jazz Quartet Featuring Sonny Murray - Action 
DEB 144   Albert Ayler - Ghosts 
DEB 145   [no issue/no information] 
DEB 146   Albert Ayler - Spirits 
DEB 147   Paul Bley Trio - Touching 
DEB 148   Cecil Taylor Jazz Unit - Nefertiti, the Beautiful One Has Come 
DEB 149   Bent Jaedig - Bent Jaedig Quintet 
DEB 150   Palle Mikkelborg Og Radio Jazz Gruppen - The Mysterious Corona 
DEB 151   The Contemporary Jazz Quintet - T.C.J.Q. 
DEB 198   Jazz Workshop - Autobiography in Jazz 
DEB 1148   Hugh Steinmetz - Nu!

See also 
 List of record labels

References

External links
 Debut Records Discography Project Page

Jazz record labels
Defunct record labels of the United States
Record labels established in 1952
Record labels disestablished in 1957